Sugar Run is a tributary of Marsh Creek in Wyoming County, Pennsylvania, in the United States. The creek is not designated as an impaired body and it contains wild trout. The surficial geology in its vicinity consists of Wisconsinan Till, alluvium, Wisconsinan Ice-Contact Stratified Drift, and wetlands.

Course
Sugar Run begins on Brier Mountain in Monroe Township. It flows east-southeast for a few tenths of a mile before entering a valley and turning north-northeast for several tenths of a mile. In this reach, the stream receives an unnamed tributary from the right and enters Northmoreland Township. The steam then turns north-northwest for a short distance and flows along the border between Eaton Township and Monroe Township until it reaches its confluence with Marsh Creek.

Geography and geology

The surficial geology at the mouth of Sugar Run mainly consists of alluvium and Wisconsinan Ice-Contact Stratified Drift. There are also patches of these materials in the stream's upper reaches. In between, the surficial geology consists of wetlands. At the stream's headwaters and on the sides of its valley, the surficial geology consists of a till known as Wisconsinan Till.

Watershed and hydrology
The stream is entirely within the United States Geological Survey quadrangle of Center Moreland.

Sugar Run is not designated as an impaired waterbody.

History
Sugar Run was entered into the Geographic Names Information System on August 2, 1979. Its identifier in the Geographic Names Information System is 1199638.

In June 2011, the Pennsylvania Fish and Boat Commission made 99 changes to its list of wild trout waters. One of these changes was the addition of the entire length of Sugar Run to its list.

Biology
Wild trout naturally reproduce in Sugar Run from its headwaters downstream to its mouth. When it was added to the Pennsylvania Fish and Boat Commission's list of wild trout streams, at least three young of the year trout or two trout of different ages were observed in it.

See also
List of rivers of Pennsylvania
List of tributaries of Bowman Creek

References

Rivers of Wyoming County, Pennsylvania
Tributaries of Bowman Creek
Rivers of Pennsylvania